Gato (Spanish for cat) may refer to:

People 
Gato (given name)
Gato (surname)

Places
 Gato Island, in the Visayan Sea, Philippines
 Gato Island, in the Mochima National Park on the northeastern coast of Venezuela
 Gato, Orocovis, Puerto Rico, a barrio

Animals
Any of a number of species in the Catshark family
El Gato, a cat owned by Jeremy Corbyn and his family

Media
 El Gato: Crime Mangler, comic by American artist Michael Aushenker
 Hombre Gato ("Cat Man"), South American legend

Fictional characters
 Anavel Gato, character in the anime Mobile Suit Gundam 0083: Stardust Memory
 El Gato Negro refers to two comic-book characters featured in the Azteca Productions' Universe
Agustin Guerrero, the original El Gato Negro
Francisco Guerrero, the second and current El Gato Negro
 El Gato, main character in the novel Keeper by Mal Peet
 Poosy Gato, resident cat in American comic strip Gordo
 El Gato, valuable artifact in the movie The Rundown from 2003 starring The Rock, Christopher Walken, Seann William Scott and Rosaria Dawson.

Video games
 Gato (computer game), a real-time submarine simulator first published in 1984 by Spectrum HoloByte for MS-DOS
 Gato, character in Garou: Mark of the Wolves
 Gato, robot in Chrono Trigger

Other software
 Gato (DeepMind), an artificial intelligence demonstration

Submarines
 Gato class submarines (launched 1941–43) of the United States Navy
  (launched 1941), first submarine of the Gato class
  (launched 1964), nuclear submarine used in the Cold War

Music 
 Gato (artform), Argentine musical style and associated dance
 Il Gato, a band from San Francisco
 "El Gato Triste", a jazz song

Sport
 Gatos de Madrid, rugby team which represented Madrid in the Super Ibérica de Rugby league in 2009

See also
 
 
 Los Gatos (disambiguation)
 Gatto, surname
 Guato (disambiguation)